Echaurren is a surname. Notable people with the surname include:

Eulogia Echaurren (1830–1887), First Lady of Chile
Federico Errázuriz Echaurren (1850-1901), Chilean lawyer and politician
Jorge Prieto Echaurren (1873–1953), Chilean lawyer and politician
Pablo Echaurren (born 1951), Italian painter